The Orange Line is the longest and first-planned of the four subway lines of the Montreal Metro in Montreal, Quebec, Canada. It formed part of the initial network, and was extended from 1980 to 1986. On April 28, 2007, three new stations in Laval opened making it the second line to leave Montreal Island.

The Orange Line measures  in length and counts 31 stations. It is the longest subway line in Montreal and the second-longest in Canada after the Line 1 Yonge–University of the Toronto subway. Like the rest of the Metro network, it is entirely underground. The line runs in a U-shape from Côte-Vertu in western Montreal to Montmorency in Laval, northwest of Montreal.

History 
The line was planned to run between Crémazie and Place-d'Armes.

Work on the Orange Line began on May 23, 1962 on Berri Street just south of Jarry Street.  In November 1962, the city of Montreal learned that it had been awarded the 1967 International and Universal Exposition (commonly known as Expo 67). To better meet the anticipated demand for transit during Expo 67, it was decided on August 6, 1963 to add the Sauvé and Henri-Bourassa stations in the north, and the Square-Victoria-OACI and Bonaventure stations in the south.

On October 14, 1966, the section between Henri-Bourassa and Place-d'Armes opened, forming part of the original Metro network. Completion of smaller sections were delayed by several months. On February 6, 1967, the segment from Place-d'Armes to Square-Victoria-OACI opened, followed on February 13, 1967, by Bonaventure.

Prior to the inauguration of the initial network, extensions were proposed in all directions, including the West Island. In its 1967 Urban Plan, entitled "Horizon 2000", the city of Montreal planned to build a network of almost  by the end of the twentieth century. On February 12, 1971, the council of the Montreal Urban Community authorized the borrowing of C$430 million to extend the Metro. This amount increased to C$665 million in 1973, and to C$1.6 billion in 1975. The terminus station, Salaberry, would have been an intermodal station with Bois-Franc commuter rail station.

From the beginning, the plan was to expand the Metro to the northwest, but massive cost overruns on the expansion of the Green Line in preparation for the 1976 Summer Olympics, led to several years of delays, including a moratorium on underground expansions in 1976. To cut costs, three planned stations (Poirier, Bois-Franc, De Salaberry) and a maintenance workshop at the end of the track were eliminated.

In 1979, the Minister of Transport, Denis de Belleval, proposed to complete the subway extension to Du Collège and to extend the rest of the line above ground. This transportation plan was rejected by the mayors of the Montreal Urban Community. The moratorium was lifted in February 1981, with a new agreement that approved the construction of one additional station, Côte-Vertu. Du Collège was considered inappropriate to play the role of a terminus.

The western segment was constructed in the 1980s and was opened in several stages. On April 28, 1980, it was extended from Bonaventure to Place-Saint-Henri. From there, the line was extended to Snowdon on September 7, 1981, on January 4, 1982 to Côte-Sainte-Catherine, on June 29, 1982 to Plamondon, on January 9, 1984 to Du Collège, and finally on November 3, 1986 to the western terminus of Côte-Vertu.

Laval extension
After a break of more than two decades of expansion, the eastern segment was extended from Henri-Bourassa by three stations into the city of Laval. The  section required digging a tunnel under the Rivière des Prairies. The three stations were Cartier, De la Concorde and Montmorency. Montmorency station is near Collège Montmorency and the Laval campus of the Université de Montréal.

The Laval extension was inaugurated on April 26, 2007, and it opened to the public on April 28. It was completely financed by the Government of Quebec, which mandated for the former  (AMT) (now ARTM) to realize the project. The STM acted as a subcontractor for the AMT and was responsible for the installation of fixed equipment. The total cost of the extension was $745 million. To that amount, $12.4 million was added in 2008 to build a second entrance to Cartier station in Libellules Park, located northeast of the intersection of des Laurentides and Cartier.

Accessibility 
All three stations in Laval were built to be wheelchair accessible, with elevators and other features for disabled persons. They were the first accessible stations on the Metro.

In the 2010s and 2020s, older stations were retrofitted to be made accessible, with the installation of elevators. As of 2022, 16 of the 31 Orange Line stations are accessible, with plans for all stations to be made accessible by the late 2030s.

Platform edge doors 
In 2019, the STM announced plans to install platform edge doors on the Orange Line, to improve safety and reduce passenger incidents (dropped objects, falls etc). The 2021-2030 Capital Expenditure Program estimated the project would cost around $560m. Due to financial difficulties following the COVID-19 pandemic, the project was cancelled in 2022.

Future extensions 
In the medium term, there are plans for the Orange Line to be further extended toward the northwest from Côte-Vertu. The extension would include two new stations: Poirier and Bois-Franc. The latter would create a transportation hub with the existing Bois-Franc station on the Réseau de transport métropolitain's Deux-Montagnes line.

After the extension of the line into Laval, Gilles Vaillancourt, a former mayor of Laval, suggested for a further six stations to be added to the line. Three of them would be in Laval and three in Montreal, which would together turn the Orange Line into a loop. In 2011, the City of Laval proposed adding eight more stations to the line, including five in Laval, to complete the loop and to serve the Carrefour Laval terminus.

On 18 June 2019, the  approved a report for extending the Orange Line by 6.4 km to the north and east of the current Côte-Vertu terminus in St-Laurent to Montmorency station in Laval, which would create a loop. Five new stations would be built located at Poirier Street, Bois-Franc, and Gouin Boulevard in Montreal, and at Chomedey and Notre-Dame Boulevard near Autoroute 15 in Laval. The extension would cost an estimated $4.5 billion and put the project in line with the estimated $4.5-billion cost of the Blue Line extension to Anjou.

Infrastructure

Maintenance
The Metro trains are stored in the Saint-Charles Garage, north of Henri-Bourassa station, and in the garage at Montmorency station for passenger cars. They are maintained at the Plateau d'Youville, which is located between Crémazie and Sauvé stations. , which is connected to the Green Line, is used for maintenance of way equipment. The Snowdon tail tracks and connecting track, which is connected to the Blue Line, is also used for maintenance of way equipment.

A new garage was built immediately north of Côte-Vertu station that opened in March 2022, expanding the capacity of the Orange line by 25% and reducing wait time between trains from 2 minutes and 30 seconds to 2 minutes across the entire line.

Rolling stock

At the line's opening in 1966, MR-63 cars were used on the Orange Line. In the early 1980s, MR-73 cars replaced the older MR-63 cars, which were used again on the Green Line. Introduced in 1976, the MR-73 is the second generation of high-performance Metro cars, identified by rectangular cab headlights, blue and dark orange interiors, 124 kW (166 hp) traction motors that growl while they accelerate out of a station, side vents, and a unique three-note sound signature when the train pulls out of a station.

With the introduction of the newer MPM-10 trains in 2016, the MR-73 trains in service on the line were gradually transferred over to the Green, Yellow, and Blue Lines. On 20 June 2018, a decorated MR-63 train gave a final "farewell tour" of the Orange Line before the model was retired from the entire system the following day. All remaining MR-73 cars operating on the line had been transferred over to the other lines by the end of 2018.

List of stations

See also 
 Green Line
 Yellow Line
 Blue Line
 Red Line (Line 3)
 List of Montreal Metro stations

References

External links 
 2008 STM System Map

 
Transport in Laval, Quebec
1966 establishments in Quebec
Rapid transit lines in Canada